Dozens of Square Enix companion books have been produced since 1998, when video game developer Square began to produce books that focused on artwork, developer interviews, and background information on the fictional worlds and characters in its games rather than on gameplay details. The first series of these books was the Perfect Works series, written and published by Square subsidiary DigiCube. They produced three books between 1998 and 1999 before the line was stopped in favor of the  series, a portmanteau of ultimate and mania. This series of books is written by Studio BentStuff, which had previously written game guides for Square for Final Fantasy VII. They were published by DigiCube until the company was dissolved in 2003. Square merged with video game publisher Enix on April 1, 2003 to form Square Enix, which resumed publication of the companion books.

Both the Perfect Works and Ultimania books have focused primarily on Square and Square Enix's role-playing video game franchises, such as the Final Fantasy and Kingdom Hearts series; over half of the more than 75 books are for games related to the Final Fantasy series. Sometimes, multiple books have been written per game or revised editions have been published years afterwards. One of the books, Final Fantasy IX Ultimania Online, was solely published online as part of an experiment by Square Enix with online content delivery; another for Final Fantasy XI was planned, but the idea was abandoned as unsuccessful and all subsequent books have been published traditionally.

The books are written and edited by Studio BentStuff. The Ultimania series had sold over  books by July 2007, increasing to over  copies sold as of 2017. The highest selling Square Enix companion books are Final Fantasy VIII Ultimania (over  copies) and Final Fantasy X Scenario Ultimania (over  copies). All of the books have been released solely in Japanese, but Dark Horse Books published English translations of the three-volume 2012 Final Fantasy 25th Memorial Ultimania as Final Fantasy Ultimania Archive in June 2018.

Perfect Works

Ultimania

References

External links
 Studio Bent Stuff official Ultimania series list (2007 archive)
 Square Enix Ultimania list (2020 archive)

Lists of books
Series of books
Square (video game company)
Companion books
Works based on video games